Fire Hall or Firemen's Hall or variations may refer to:

in the United States
Firemen's Hall (Cannon Falls, Minnesota), listed on the National Register of Historic Places (NRHP)
Revere Fire Hall, Revere, Minnesota, NRHP-listed
Fire Hall (Joliet, Montana), NRHP-listed in Carbon County
Fireman's Hall (Alfred, New York), NRHP-listed
Firemen's Hall (College Point, New York), NRHP-listed in Queens County, within New York City
Fire Hall (Bismarck, North Dakota), formerly NRHP-listed in Burleigh County

See also
List of fire stations